Cornerstone is the twenty-first album in the live praise and worship series of contemporary worship music by Hillsong Live. It reached No. 2 on the ARIA Albums Chart, debuted at No. 32 on the Billboard 200 chart, and became the No. 1 album on the Billboard Christian Albums chart.

Its first single was "Hope of the World", a song written by Jason Ingram, Reuben Morgan and Matthew Bronleewee, that also is available in Studio Version, in the Deluxe Edition (Digital). Two live music videos has been released on their VEVO channel: "Hope of the World" and "Cornerstone" featuring Reuben Morgan and David Ware respectively. "Cornerstone" is a reworking of the verses from Edward Mote's "My Hope Is Built on Nothing Less".

This is the last Hillsong Live album to feature Darlene Zschech as a worship leader and this is the first time that Zschech did not contribute any of her original songs.

Recording

Cornerstone was recorded at the Allphones Arena in Sydney Olympic Park, the Sydney Entertainment Centre, and the Hillsong Convention Centre by Reuben Morgan, Joel Houston, Darlene Zschech and the Hillsong Live team on 30 October 2011 and in early 2012. The worship night was called "Together As One: Our Live Album Recording".

Critical reception

New Release Tuesday : I eagerly await each new Hillsong release and Cornerstone is truly stellar and is the top overall album by Hillsong LIVE. Every single song could be added to your Sunday morning worship set.
Louder Than The Music: This album is full of great songs that will be used for times of worship.

Extended play 
Cornerstone is also a related live extended play by Hillsong Live, which was released in May 2012. The EP includes two songs in two different versions, live and studio.

Track listing

Note
 "Cornerstone" contains verses from "The Solid Rock" written by Edward Mote.

Extended play

Personnel 

 David Andrew – keyboards
 Jay Cook – frontline singer
 Paul Cox – backline technician
 Matt Crocker - worship leader, acoustic guitar, banjo
 Jenny Deacon – frontline singer
 Katie Dodson – frontline singer
 Jonathon Douglass - worship leader
 Ben Fielding - worship leader, acoustic guitar
 Annie Garratt - worship leader
 Jad Gillies - worship leader, acoustic guitar
 Elizabeth Gorringe – French horn
 Autumn Hardman – keyboards
 Nigel Hendroff – electric guitar, acoustic guitar
 Hannah Hobbs – frontline singer
 Lauren Hodges – violin
 Bobbie Houston – senior pastor
 Brian Houston – senior pastor
 Joel Houston - executive producer, worship leader, electric guitar, acoustic guitar
 Peter James – keyboards
 Timon Klein – electric guitar
 Sam Knock – frontline singer
 Simon Kobler – percussion
 Brad Kohring – frontline singer
 Hayley Law – frontline singer
 Eric Liljero – frontline singer
 Jill McCloghry – frontline singer
 Dan McMurray – drums
 Reuben Morgan - executive producer, worship leader, electric guitar, acoustic guitar, worship pastor
 Bob Mpofu – bass guitar
 Sheila Mpofu – frontline singer
 Aaron Polley – keyboards
 Janosh Rauscher (ICF Church Zurich) – frontline singer, percussion (ICF Church Zurich) ("Hope of the World")
 Jarryd Scully – electric guitar
 Celeste Shackleton – cello
 Sloane Simpson – frontline singer
 J.P. Starra – percussion
 Isaac Soon – electric guitar
 Katrina Tadman – frontline singer
 Marcus Temu – frontline singer
 Ben Tennikoff – pump organ, accordion, glockenspiel
 Dylan Thomas – electric guitar ("Beneath the Waters (I Will Rise)")
 Dean Ussher - worship leader, acoustic guitar
 Dave Ware - worship leader
 Marc Warry – trombone
 Ben Whincop – bass guitar
 Harrison Wood – drums
 Darlene Zschech - worship leader

Singles

 "Hope of the World" (2012)

Formats
Standard CD (12 LIVE Songs, 1 Bonus Track)
Standard DVD (15 Video Songs, 2 Bonus Features)
Standard Digital Download (12 LIVE Songs, 1 Bonus Track)
Standard Blu-ray + DVD + Digital Copy (15 Video Songs, 15 Video Songs HD (Blu-ray), 15 Digital Videos, 2 Bonus Features)
Australian Special Limited Edition CD + DVD + Digital Copy (15 Video Songs, 15 Digital Videos, 15 LIVE Songs [Special Packing]) [Sold Out]
Deluxe Edition CD + DVD (15 LIVE Songs, 15 Video Songs, 2 Bonus Features)
Deluxe Digital (15 LIVE Songs, 3 Studio Songs, 1 Talk)

Charts and certifications

Weekly charts

Year-end charts

Certifications

References

2012 live albums
2012 video albums
Hillsong Music live albums
Hillsong Music video albums
Live video albums

es:Cornerstone